Piers David Nash (born 8 August 1969) is an entrepreneur, cancer biology professor, data evangelist, writer and technology futurist. He is the son of academic Roger Nash.

Early life and education 
Born in Exeter, England, and grew up in Sudbury, Ontario, Canada. In high school he competed in the Canada-Wide Science Fair in five successive years (1983–87), winning awards on each occasion and becoming one of the most highly awarded science fair participants in the history of the fair. In recognition of this he was selected to represent Canada as one of two youth delegates to the 1985 Nobel Prize lectures and ceremony in Stockholm, Sweden as part of the Stockholm International Youth Science Seminar and was awarded the International Youth Year Ontario Gold Medal. He received a BSc with honours in biochemistry from the University of Guelph, and the Chemical Institute of Canada prize for the top of class and President's Scholarship. He received a PhD in 1999 from the University of Alberta working in the laboratory of Dr. Grant McFadden investigating poxviral immunomodulatory proteins. His doctoral thesis focused on the enzymology and biological properties of the Myxoma virus encoded serine proteinase inhibitor (serpin), SERP-1. He completed postdoctoral research with Anthony Pawson at the Samuel Lunenfeld Research Institute of Mount Sinai Hospital and the University of Toronto from June 1999 to December 2003. In 2014, Nash received an MBA with a concentration in finance awarded with high honors from the University of Chicago Booth School of Business. From 2014 to 2017, Nash was Director in the Center for Data-Intensive Science that was building and managing the National Cancer Institute Genomic Data Commons with Robert Lee Grossman.

Career 
Nash is the founder and CEO of Sympatic Inc. Nash is Founder & General Manager of Nash Strategy & Innovation. He advises Fortune 500 technology companies and startups in the genomics, healthcare, data science and data storage fields. He serves on the Advisory Boards of technology and innovation companies. Nash was Managing Director at Health2047, the innovation enterprise of the American Medical Association from 2017-2018. He was founding Strategy Manager, Director of business & research development for the University of Chicago's Center for Data Intensive Science which developed the National Cancer Institute Genomic Data Commons. He was a professor in the Ben May Department for Cancer Research and a Scientist of the Comprehensive Cancer Center at the University of Chicago from 2004–2012 and a fellow of the Institute for Genomics and Systems Biology from 2006–2012. As a scientist, he investigates protein–protein interactions involved in signal transduction, and the molecular mechanisms by which cells respond to external cues. His work at the University of Chicago focused on understanding the SH2 domain at a systems level and investigating the role of ubiquitination in controlling endocytosis and modulating signal transduction. Earlier work focused on the emergent properties of complex systems such as ultrasensitivity (all-or-none switches) at critical junctures in the cell cycle.

ResearchGate reports 54 peer-reviewed published works in a wide range of fields, including signal transduction, cell biology, molecular evolution, cell cycle, cognition and memory, meteorology, and pedagogy. Scopus notes an h-index of 30 and 4488 citations of 51 publications tracked in that database since 1996.

Notes

External links
 Could health data privacy kill you? Op-Ed in The Hill
 A Hippocratic Oath for Big Data Op-Ed in The Hill
 Nash Blog 
 SH2 domain website
 The Ben May Institute for Cancer Research
 Publications noted on PubMed (NCBI)
 Press Release Science Blog post about two papers
 Profile on MS Academic Research beta

1969 births
Living people
British biochemists
American biochemists
Canadian biochemists
University of Chicago faculty
University of Guelph alumni
University of Alberta alumni
British expatriates in the United States
Canadian expatriates in the United States
People from Greater Sudbury
Scientists from Exeter
Scientists from Ontario